Marcin Krzysztof Koniusz (born 12 September 1983 in Sosnowiec) is a Polish sabre fencer. He won a total of four medals, including a silver in the individual event, at the European Fencing Championships (2003 in Bourges, France, 2004 in Copenhagen, Denmark, and 2005 in Zalaegerszeg, Hungary).

Koniusz represented Poland at the 2008 Summer Olympics in Beijing, where he competed for the men's individual sabre. He defeated Venezuela's Carlos Bravo in the first preliminary round, before losing out his next match to German fencer Nicolas Limbach, with a final score of 7–15.

References

External links
 Profile at the European Fencing Confederation
NBC 2008 Olympics profile

Polish male fencers
Living people
Olympic fencers of Poland
Fencers at the 2008 Summer Olympics
People from Sosnowiec
1983 births
Sportspeople from Silesian Voivodeship
20th-century Polish people
21st-century Polish people